Egesina ornata is a species of beetle in the family Cerambycidae. It was described by Warren Samuel Fisher in 1925. It is known from Malaysia and Borneo.

References

Egesina
Beetles described in 1925